Sándor Ádám, (21 July 1918 – 2 November 1974) was an association football player, forward  on the right side.

Career

At Újpest
He played for  Újpest between 1936. and 1943.they won the championship in the season of 1938-1939. He played on 116 matches in the championship and scored 37 goals.

At the national team
He played for the nation at two times and scored one goal.

Successes
 Hungarian Championship
 Champion: 1938–39
 2.: 1937–38, 1940–41, 1941–42
 3.: 1936–37, 1939–40

References

Sources
 Antal Zoltán – Hoffer József: Alberttől Zsákig, Budapest, Sportkiadó, 1968
 Rejtő László – Lukács László – Szepesi György: Felejthetetlen 90 percek, Budapest, Sportkiadó, 1977, 

1918 births
1974 deaths
Hungarian footballers
Hungary international footballers
Association football forwards
Újpest FC players